Antaeotricha destillata is a moth in the family Depressariidae. It was described by Philipp Christoph Zeller in 1877. It is found in Panama and Colombia.

References

Moths described in 1877
destillata
Moths of South America
Moths of Central America